Eddy Piñeiro Jr. (born September 13, 1995) is an American football Kicker who is currently a free agent. He played college football at Florida, and signed with the Oakland Raiders as an undrafted free agent in 2018 before joining the Chicago Bears the following year.

Early life
Piñeiro was born in Miami, Florida, to a Cuban father and Nicaraguan mother. His father, Eddy Sr., came to the United States from Cuba at the age of nine during the Mariel boatlift of 1980 and later had a professional soccer career with the Fort Lauderdale Strikers of the ASL/APSL.

Piñeiro started off playing soccer like his father; he was a four-time All-Dade County pick in soccer. Despite having grown up only playing soccer, he joined the Miami Sunset Senior High football team in his senior season, handling extra points and kickoffs.

College career
Piñeiro signed with Florida Atlantic on a scholarship to play soccer but academic issues prevented him from attending. His dad encouraged him to try on football cleats and pads but with no football scholarship, Piñeiro went on to play soccer for a small junior college, ASA College. In 2015, Piñeiro went to an open kicking combine at Alabama. Out of hundreds of kickers, Alabama coach Nick Saban narrowed his scholarship offers to Chris Salek and Piñeiro. Piñeiro verbally committed to Alabama, but later tried out for Florida and ultimately chose to play there. Special Teams Coordinator Marc Nudelberg was instrumental in recruiting Piñeiro to UF. 

Piñeiro played for the Gators during the 2016 and 2017 seasons. During his final year at Florida, Piñeiro had the best field goal percentage in the nation, making 17 out of 18 attempts for a 94.4% conversion rate. His career conversion rate of 88.4% (38-for-43) ranks first in school history (minimum 35 attempts), surpassing Bobby Raymond (who made 43 of 49 kicks, or 87.8%, in 1983 and 1984). Piñeiro's 38 made field goals rank sixth in school history, and his streak of 16 straight made field goals to close the 2017 season tied Jeff Chandler (2001) for the second-longest streak in program history.

Professional career

Oakland Raiders
Piñeiro declared for the 2018 NFL Draft early after only two seasons with the Gators, only to go undrafted. He signed with the Oakland Raiders as an undrafted free agent on May 4, 2018. He was placed on injured reserve on September 1, 2018.

Chicago Bears

2019 season
On May 6, 2019, Piñeiro was traded to the Chicago Bears in exchange for a conditional seventh-round pick in the 2021 NFL Draft, and he was one of nine participants in the Bears' 2019 summer kicking competition to replace Cody Parkey. The tryout was orchestrated by coach Matt Nagy to find a new kicker in the wake of the Bears' "Double-Doink" loss against the Philadelphia Eagles in the playoffs, when Parkey missed the game-winning field goal when the ball hit the upright and then bounced off the crossbar before falling to the ground.

On August 24, in a preseason game against the Indianapolis Colts, Piñeiro connected on field goals from 21 yards and 58 yards away. He also went 2-for-2 on extra points. Piñeiro finished the 2019 preseason connecting on 8 of 9 field goals and 3 of 4 extra points. His misses included a 48-yard field goal attempt against the Carolina Panthers on August 8, 2019, and an extra point attempt that went very wide to the left against the Tennessee Titans on August 29, 2019.

In the first game of the 2019 regular season against the Green Bay Packers, Piñeiro made his first NFL field goal on a 38-yard kick. The field goal ended up being the only points the Bears scored as they lost 10–3. During Week 2, Piñeiro kicked a game-winning 53-yard field goal as time expired to give the Bears a 16–14 win over the Denver Broncos. He also made a 52-yard field goal in the second quarter. For his performance, Piñeiro was named NFC Special Teams Player of the Week.

In Week 8, Piñeiro missed two out of five field goal attempts, including a potential game-winning 41-yard attempt as time expired, as the Bears lost to the Los Angeles Chargers 17–16. He missed his first regular-season extra point the following week, when his second of three extra-point attempts sailed wide right. He made his two other extra-point attempts in the Bears' 20–13 win over the Detroit Lions. He had been perfect on his first 15 attempts.

In Week 11, Piñeiro missed two field goals in the Bears' three first-quarter possessions during their game against the Los Angeles Rams; the Bears eventually lost 17–7. Nagy commented he would stick with Piñeiro as his kicker, and that he would not bring other kickers in to try out, even though Piñeiro was ranked 31st in the league in field-goal percentage at that point.

After missing an extra point (but making his two field goal attempts) in the Bears' Week 12 win over the New York Giants, Piñeiro was perfect in the final five games of the season, including making all nine field goal attempts and all eight extra point attempts. In the season finale against the Minnesota Vikings, he was perfect on one extra point and four field goal attempts, including the game-winning 22-yarder to secure the 21–19 victory.

Piñeiro ended the 2019 season with 23 of 28 field goals made (82.1 percent).

2020 season 
After the 2019 season, both coach Matt Nagy and general manager Ryan Pace expressed confidence that Piñeiro would be the team's kicker in 2020. "For us, you all know, [kicker] was a huge, huge, big void that we had going into this year," Nagy said. "I feel pretty good that that void is filled. I feel like that's a positive from this year."

In April, the Bears announced that they had signed former Nevada kicker Ramiz Ahmed and intended for Ahmed to compete with Piñeiro for the Bears' 2020 placekicker job. Pace explained, "We see those guys competing. Look, we love Eddy, and we think his future's very bright.... But those two competing against each other is a really good thing."

On August 11, Ahmed was waived, effectively making Piñeiro the Bears' kicker for the 2020 season. However, Piñeiro struggled with a groin injury that prevented him from kicking in training camp and resulted in him being placed on injured reserve on September 8. He remained on injured reserve for the entirety of the 2020 season.

Indianapolis Colts
Piñeiro signed with the Indianapolis Colts on May 17, 2021, but was waived on August 24, 2021.

Washington Football Team
Piñeiro signed with the Washington Football Team's practice squad on September 3, 2021, but was released a week later.

New York Jets
On December 6, 2021, Piñeiro signed with the New York Jets. He went on go 8-for-8 on field goals and 9-for-10 on extra points and received a RFA tender in 2022. On August 23, 2022, he was released.

Carolina Panthers
On August 31, 2022, Piñeiro signed with the Carolina Panthers following an injury to Zane Gonzalez. In Week 8, Piñeiro missed two potential game-winning kicks against the Atlanta Falcons. In Week 14, Piñeiro had 12 points on three field goals and three extra points in a 30-24 win over the Seahawks, earning NFC Special Teams Player of the Week.

NFL career statistics

Personal life
Piñeiro is a Christian. In 2017, Piñeiro and his father, Eddy Piñeiro Sr., were awarded the Police Service Award from the Gainesville Police Department for helping a woman escape from a domestic abuser.

Piñeiro is the first player of Nicaraguan descent to play in the NFL. Before the Bears’ October 2019 game against the Oakland Raiders in London, Piñeiro received a glass sculpture as a gift from Nicaragua’s ambassador to the United Kingdom.

References

External links
Florida Gators bio

Living people
1995 births
Miami Sunset Senior High School alumni
Players of American football from Miami
American football placekickers
American people of Nicaraguan descent
American sportspeople of Cuban descent
Florida Gators football players
Oakland Raiders players
Chicago Bears players
Indianapolis Colts players
Washington Football Team players
New York Jets players
Carolina Panthers players
Soccer players from Florida
Junior college men's soccer players in the United States
Association footballers not categorized by position
Association football players not categorized by nationality